Michelle Keegan is an English actress, who found popular success playing Tina McIntyre in the ITV soap opera Coronation Street (2008–2014). The role earned her widespread recognition and various accolades, including six Inside Soap Awards, three TV Choice Awards, a TV Now Award, and seven British Soap Awards including six consecutive for Sexiest Female between 2009 and 2014. The Guardian listed Tina as one of the 10 best Coronation Street characters of all time in 2010.

Following her departure from Coronation Street, Keegan starred in television dramas, including Ordinary Lies (2015),  Our Girl (2016–2020) and Tina and Bobby (2017). For her portrayal of Lance Corporal Georgie Lane in Our Girl, she received the Best Actress TV Choice Award in 2018. Keegan was also named FHMs Sexiest Woman in the World in 2015.

Awards and nominations

Notes

References

External links
 List of awards and nominations at the Internet Movie Database

Keegan, Michelle